Troublesome Night 6 is a 1999 Hong Kong horror comedy film produced by Nam Yin and directed by Herman Yau. It is the sixth of the 20 films in the Troublesome Night film series.

Plot
Four years ago, four paparazzi were stalking Kwok Siu-Heung, a model who was dating a rich tycoon. After Kwok fell to her death from a rooftop and landed right in front of them, they meddled with her dead body and snapped photos from various angles before fleeing the scene. The photos made it to the cover story of the magazine.

In the present day, Chak, a police inspector, and his colleagues are investigating the death of one of the paparazzi who has been found dead inside a lift. Chak also experiences visions of Kwok's ghost, wearing a red dress and holding a red umbrella; he thinks that she is trying to communicate something to him. As Chak and his team uncover more clues pointing to Kwok's suicide, the other three paparazzi die under mysterious circumstances in similar ways as the first one.

While he is drunk, Chak enters a dreamy state and suddenly recalls that he met Kwok on the night she died. They were making out on the rooftop when she dared him to follow suit if she jumped off. Thinking it was a joke, Chak agreed and told her that he will be next if she died. To his horror, she then plunged to her death in front of him. He immediately rushed down and tried to call for help but got knocked down by a car. After recovering from a coma, he could not remember what happened that night – until now. Kwok's ghost appears to Chak and reminds him of what he promised her.

Cast
 Louis Koo as Chak
 Gigi Lai as Kwok Siu-Heung
 Simon Lui as Chung
 Amanda Lee as Long Hair
 Wayne Lai as Mr Lai
 Frankie Ng as Bob
 Peter Ngor as Alan
 Law Lan as Kwok's mother
 Nnadia Chan as Kwok Siu-Lin
 Lam Yi-tung as Fan
 Man Sai as Vore
 Belinda Hamnett as Mrs Lin
 Fung Hong-ling as Lin Tianzheng
 Raymond Leung as Officer Lau
 Ronald Wong as bar waiter

External links
 
 

1999 films
1990s comedy horror films
Hong Kong comedy horror films
1990s Cantonese-language films
1999 horror films
Troublesome Night (film series)
1999 comedy films
1990s Hong Kong films